The FIS Ski Flying World Ski Championships 2000 took place on 14 February 2000 in Vikersund, Norway for the third time. Vikersund hosted the championships previously in 1977 and 1990. The event was limited to three jumps due to weather conditions.

Individual
14 February 2000

Medal table

References
 FIS Ski flying World Championships 2000 results. - accessed 28 November 2009.

FIS Ski Flying World Championships
2000 in ski jumping
2000 in Norwegian sport
Ski jumping competitions in Norway
Modum
February 2000 sports events in Europe